Cerro Veronese is a comune (municipality) in the Province of Verona in the Italian region Veneto, located about  west of Venice and about  north of Verona. It is part of the Thirteen Communities, a group of villages which historically speak the Cimbrian language.

Cerro Veronese borders the following municipalities: Bosco Chiesanuova, Grezzana, and Roverè Veronese.

Celebrations

Sant'Osvaldo
Cerro people used to celebrate their saint protector, Saint Oswald, every 5 August with a religious ceremony in the main church. In addition, the celebration lasts a pair of days with local food stands (in particular typical salami and cheese) and popular fairs.

Fragolosa
Also known as Festa della fragola (Strawberry festival), it's the most important event concerning a typical fruit of the zone, strawberry (in Italian fragola). It's the most awaited celebration after Giocondo's death. Fragolosa is mainly celebrated on the second weekend of July and it's one week long. A lot of stands are exposed, especially in the Piazza Alferia, the largest square of the town.

Demographic evolution

References

External links
 www.cerro-veronese.it/

Cities and towns in Veneto